Demi Frances Runas (born 1991) is an American professional golfer who is currently on the LPGA Tour. She began her professional career in 2014.

Early life
Runas was born in 1991 in Los Angeles, California to Filipino parents. She first played golf at the age of 8. She attended Torrance High School in Torrance, California. Throughout high school, Runas was active in the schools golf and soccer teams.

College golf career
Runas attended University of California, Davis where she was a member of the golf team. In 2009-10, she had seven top-20 finishes, including a runner-up showing at the Juli Inkster Spartan Invitational. She capped her Big West tournament debut with a 1-over 73, tied for lowest of the day. She finished the year with All-Big West First team honors as well as Big West Player of the Year. She advanced to U.S. Women's Amateur quarterfinals in the summer following sophomore season. In Runas' final two years, she continued being awarded All-Conference and Player of the year honors, including two more advancements to match play at U.S. Women's Amateur her junior and senior years.

Professional golf career
Runas played on the Symetra Tour in 2014, with two second place and two third place finishes, She finished ninth on the money list to earn her 2015 LPGA Tour card.

Runas made her LPGA Tour debut on January 8, 2015 at the Coates Golf Championship finishing 6-over after two rounds and missing the cut. In March 2015, Runas recorded her first earnings when she finished 6-under at the JTBC Founders Cup and finished 54th overall for $4,300. In 2016, Runas recorded her first top-ten finish, at the Meijer LPGA Classic, finishing tied for 10th with 9-under.

LPGA Tour career summary

References

External links

American female golfers
LPGA Tour golfers
Golfers from Los Angeles
University of California, Davis alumni
Sportspeople from Torrance, California
1991 births
Living people
21st-century American women